The 119th United States Congress is the next meeting of the legislative branch of the United States federal government, composed of the United States Senate and the United States House of Representatives. It is scheduled to meet in Washington, D.C., from January 3, 2025, to January 3, 2027, during the final weeks of the first term of Joe Biden's presidency, and the first two years of the presidential term that will occur following the 2024 United States presidential election. The elections of November 2024 will decide control of both houses.

Major events 

 January 3, 2025: Congress scheduled to convene.
 January 6, 2025: Joint Session to count electoral votes and certify the 2024 United States presidential election.
 January 20, 2025: 60th Presidential Inauguration.

Leadership 
Note: Democrats refer to themselves as a "Caucus"; Republicans refer to themselves as a "Conference".

Senate

Presiding 

 President: Kamala Harris (at least until January 20, 2025)
 President pro tempore: TBD

House of Representatives

Presiding 

 Speaker: TBD

Members

Senate 

The numbers refer to their Senate classes. All class 1 seats will be contested in the November 2024 elections. In this Congress, class 1 means their term commenced in the current Congress, requiring re-election in 2030; class 2 means their term ends with this Congress, requiring re-election in 2026; and class 3 means their term began in the last Congress, requiring re-election in 2028.

Alabama 
 2. Tommy Tuberville (R)
 3. Katie Britt (R)

Alaska 
 2. Dan Sullivan (R)
 3. Lisa Murkowski (R)

Arizona 
 1: TBD
 3. Mark Kelly (D)

Arkansas 
 2. Tom Cotton (R)
 3. John Boozman (R)

California 
 1: TBD
 3. Alex Padilla (D)

Colorado 
 2. John Hickenlooper (D)
 3. Michael Bennet (D)

Connecticut 
 1: TBD
 3. Richard Blumenthal (D)

Delaware 
 1: TBD
 2. Chris Coons (D)

Florida 
 1: TBD
 3. Marco Rubio (R)

Georgia 
 2. Jon Ossoff (D)
 3. Raphael Warnock (D)

Hawaii 
 1: TBD
 3. Brian Schatz (D)

Idaho 
 2. Jim Risch (R)
 3. Mike Crapo (R)

Illinois 
 2. Dick Durbin (D)
 3. Tammy Duckworth (D)

Indiana 
 1: TBD
 3. Todd Young (R)

Iowa 
 2. Joni Ernst (R)
 3. Chuck Grassley (R)

Kansas 
 2. Roger Marshall (R)
 3. Jerry Moran (R)

Kentucky 
 2. Mitch McConnell (R)
 3. Rand Paul (R)

Louisiana 
 2. Bill Cassidy (R)
 3. John Kennedy (R)

Maine 
 1: TBD
 2. Susan Collins (R)

Maryland 
 1: TBD
 3. Chris Van Hollen (D)

Massachusetts 
 1: TBD
 2. Ed Markey (D)

Michigan 
 1: TBD
 2. Gary Peters (D)

Minnesota 
 1: TBD
 2. Tina Smith (DFL)

Mississippi 
 1: TBD
 2. Cindy Hyde-Smith (R)

Missouri 
 1: TBD
 3. Eric Schmitt (R)

Montana 
 1: TBD
 2. Steve Daines (R)

Nebraska 
 1: TBD
 2. TBD

Nevada 
 1: TBD
 3. Catherine Cortez Masto (D)

New Hampshire 
 2. Jeanne Shaheen (D)
 3. Maggie Hassan (D)

New Jersey 
 1: TBD
 2. Cory Booker (D)

New Mexico 
 1: TBD
 2. Ben Ray Luján (D)

New York 
 1: TBD
 3. Chuck Schumer (D)

North Carolina 
 2. Thom Tillis (R)
 3. Ted Budd (R)

North Dakota 
 1: TBD
 3. John Hoeven (R)

Ohio 
 1: TBD
 3. J. D. Vance (R)

Oklahoma 
 2. Markwayne Mullin (R)
 3. James Lankford (R)

Oregon 
 2. Jeff Merkley (D)
 3. Ron Wyden (D)

Pennsylvania 
 1: TBD
 3. John Fetterman (D)

Rhode Island 
 1: TBD
 2. Jack Reed (D)

South Carolina 
 2. Lindsey Graham (R)
 3. Tim Scott (R)

South Dakota 
 2. Mike Rounds (R)
 3. John Thune (R)

Tennessee 
 1: TBD
 2. Bill Hagerty (R)

Texas 
 1: TBD
 2. John Cornyn (R)

Utah 
 1: TBD
 3. Mike Lee (R)

Vermont 
 1: TBD
 3. Peter Welch (D)

Virginia 
 1: TBD
 2. Mark Warner (D)

Washington 
 1: TBD
 3. Patty Murray (D)

West Virginia 
 1: TBD
 2. Shelley Moore Capito (R)

Wisconsin 
 1: TBD
 3. Ron Johnson (R)

Wyoming 
 1: TBD
 2. Cynthia Lummis (R)

House of Representatives 

All 435 seats will be filled by election in November 2024.

Alabama
 . TBD
 . TBD
 . TBD
 . TBD
 . TBD
 . TBD
 . TBD

Alaska
 . TBD

Arizona
 . TBD
 . TBD
 . TBD
 . TBD
 . TBD
 . TBD
 . TBD
 . TBD
 . TBD

Arkansas
 . TBD
 . TBD
 . TBD
 . TBD

California
 . TBD
 . TBD
 . TBD
 . TBD
 . TBD
 . TBD
 . TBD
 . TBD
 . TBD
 . TBD
 . TBD
 . TBD
 . TBD
 . TBD
 . TBD
 . TBD
 . TBD
 . TBD
 . TBD
 . TBD
 . TBD
 . TBD
 . TBD
 . TBD
 . TBD
 . TBD
 . TBD
 . TBD
 . TBD
 . TBD
 . TBD
 . TBD
 . TBD
 . TBD
 . TBD
 . TBD
 . TBD
 . TBD
 . TBD
 . TBD
 . TBD
 . TBD
 . TBD
 . TBD
 . TBD
 . TBD
 . TBD
 . TBD
 . TBD
 . TBD
 . TBD
 . TBD

Colorado
 . TBD
 . TBD
 . TBD
 . TBD
 . TBD
 . TBD
 . TBD
 . TBD

Connecticut
 .TBD
 .TBD
 .TBD
 .TBD
 .TBD

Delaware
 . TBD

Florida
 . TBD
 . TBD
 . TBD
 . TBD
 . TBD
 . TBD
 . TBD
 . TBD
 . TBD
 . TBD
 . TBD
 . TBD
 . TBD
 . TBD
 . TBD
 . TBD
 . TBD
 . TBD
 . TBD
 . TBD
 . TBD
 . TBD
 . TBD
 . TBD
 . TBD
 . TBD
 . TBD
 . TBD

Georgia
 . TBD
 . TBD
 . TBD
 . TBD
 . TBD
 . TBD
 . TBD
 . TBD
 . TBD
 . TBD
 . TBD
 . TBD
 . TBD
 . TBD

Hawaii
 . TBD
 . TBD

Idaho
 . TBD
 . TBD

Illinois
 . TBD
 . TBD
 . TBD
 . TBD
 . TBD
 . TBD
 . TBD
 . TBD
 . TBD
 . TBD
 . TBD
 . TBD
 . TBD
 . TBD
 . TBD
 . TBD
 . TBD

Indiana
 . TBD
 . TBD
 . TBD
 . TBD
 . TBD
 . TBD
 . TBD
 . TBD
 . TBD

Iowa
 . TBD
 . TBD
 . TBD
 . TBD

Kansas
 . TBD
 . TBD
 . TBD
 . TBD

Kentucky
 . TBD
 . TBD
 . TBD
 . TBD
 . TBD
 . TBD

Louisiana
 . TBD
 . TBD
 . TBD
 . TBD
 . TBD
 . TBD

Maine
 . TBD
 . TBD

Maryland
 . TBD
 . TBD
 . TBD
 . TBD
 . TBD
 . TBD
 . TBD
 . TBD

Massachusetts
 . TBD
 . TBD
 . TBD
 . TBD
 . TBD
 . TBD
 . TBD
 . TBD
 . TBD

Michigan
 . TBD
 . TBD
 . TBD
 . TBD
 . TBD
 . TBD
 . TBD
 . TBD
 . TBD
 . TBD
 . TBD
 . TBD
 . TBD

Minnesota
 . TBD
 . TBD
 . TBD
 . TBD
 . TBD
 . TBD
 . TBD
 . TBD

Mississippi
 . TBD
 . TBD
 . TBD
 . TBD

Missouri
 . TBD
 . TBD
 . TBD
 . TBD
 . TBD
 . TBD
 . TBD
 . TBD

Montana
 . TBD
 . TBD

Nebraska
 . TBD
 . TBD
 . TBD

Nevada
 . TBD
 . TBD
 . TBD
 . TBD

New Hampshire
 . TBD
 . TBD

New Jersey
 . TBD
 . TBD
 . TBD
 . TBD
 . TBD
 . TBD
 . TBD
 . TBD
 . TBD
 . TBD
 . TBD
 . TBD

New Mexico
 . TBD
 . TBD
 . TBD

New York
 . TBD
 . TBD
 . TBD
 . TBD
 . TBD
 . TBD
 . TBD
 . TBD
 . TBD
 . TBD
 . TBD
 . TBD
 . TBD
 . TBD
 . TBD
 . TBD
 . TBD
 . TBD
 . TBD
 . TBD
 . TBD
 . TBD
 . TBD
 . TBD
 . TBD
 . TBD

North Carolina
 . TBD
 . TBD
 . TBD
 . TBD
 . TBD
 . TBD
 . TBD
 . TBD
 . TBD
 . TBD
 . TBD
 . TBD
 . TBD
 . TBD

North Dakota
 . TBD

Ohio
 . TBD
 . TBD
 . TBD
 . TBD
 . TBD
 . TBD
 . TBD
 . TBD
 . TBD
 . TBD
 . TBD
 . TBD
 . TBD
 . TBD
 . TBD

Oklahoma
 . TBD
 . TBD
 . TBD
 . TBD
 . TBD

Oregon
 . TBD
 . TBD
 . TBD
 . TBD
 . TBD
 . TBD

Pennsylvania
 . TBD
 . TBD
 . TBD
 . TBD
 . TBD
 . TBD
 . TBD
 . TBD
 . TBD
 . TBD
 . TBD
 . TBD
 . TBD
 . TBD
 . TBD
 . TBD
 . TBD

Rhode Island
 . TBD
 . TBD

South Carolina
 . TBD
 . TBD
 . TBD
 . TBD
 . TBD
 . TBD
 . TBD

South Dakota
 . TBD

Tennessee
 . TBD
 . TBD
 . TBD
 . TBD
 . TBD
 . TBD
 . TBD
 . TBD
 . TBD

Texas
 . TBD
 . TBD
 . TBD
 . TBD
 . TBD
 . TBD
 . TBD
 . TBD
 . TBD
 . TBD
 . TBD
 . TBD
 . TBD
 . TBD
 . TBD
 . TBD
 . TBD
 . TBD
 . TBD
 . TBD
 . TBD
 . TBD
 . TBD
 . TBD
 . TBD
 . TBD
 . TBD
 . TBD
 . TBD
 . TBD
 . TBD
 . TBD
 . TBD
 . TBD
 . TBD
 . TBD
 . TBD
 . TBD

Utah
 . TBD
 . TBD
 . TBD
 . TBD

Vermont
 . TBD

Virginia
 . TBD
 . TBD
 . TBD
 . TBD
 . TBD
 . TBD
 . TBD
 . TBD
 . TBD
 . TBD
 . TBD

Washington
 . TBD
 . TBD
 . TBD
 . TBD
 . TBD
 . TBD
 . TBD
 . TBD
 . TBD
 . TBD

West Virginia
 . TBD
 . TBD

Wisconsin
 . TBD
 . TBD
 . TBD
 . TBD
 . TBD
 . TBD
 . TBD
 . TBD

Wyoming
 . TBD

Non-voting members
 . TBD
 . TBD
 . TBD
 . TBD
 . TBD
 . TBD

Changes in membership

Senate 

|}

House of Representatives 

|}

Committees 
Section contents: Senate, House, Joint

Senate

House of Representatives

Joint

Officers and officials

Congress 

 Architect of the Capitol: Brett Blanton
 Attending Physician: Brian P. Monahan

Senate 

 Chaplain: Barry Black
 Curator: Melinda Smith
 Historian: Betty Koed
 Librarian: Leona I. Faust
 Parliamentarian:TBD
 Secretary: TBD
 Sergeant at Arms and Doorkeeper: TBD

House of Representatives 

 Chaplain: Margaret G. Kibben
 Chief Administrative Officer: TBD
 Clerk: TBD
 Historian: Matthew Wasniewski
 Parliamentarian: Jason Smith
 Reading Clerks: Joe Novotny (D) and Susan Cole (R)
 Sergeant at Arms: TBD

See also 

 2024 United States elections (elections leading to this Congress)
 2024 United States Senate elections
 2024 United States House of Representatives elections
 2026 United States elections (elections during this Congress, leading to the next Congress)
 2026 United States Senate elections
 2026 United States House of Representatives elections

Notes

References 

 
2020s in American politics